Rúrec, also spelled Rurec, (possibly from Quechua ruri interior; valley or little river, -q a suffix) is a  mountain in the southern part of the Cordillera Blanca in the Andes of Peru. It is located in the Ancash Region, Huaraz Province, Olleros District, and in the Huari Province, Chavín de Huantar District. Rúrec is located south of Huantsán.

References

Mountains of Peru
Mountains of Ancash Region